Section 4 may refer to:

 Section 4 of the Constitution of Australia
 Section 4 of the Canadian Charter of Rights and Freedoms
 Section 4 of the Human Rights Act 1998

See also

MI4, British Directorate of Military Intelligence, Section 4